The Margarita Latin American and Caribbean Film Festival, sometimes known as FilMar,:107 is an important international cultural event dedicated to generating spaces for the distribution and promotion of the best of Venezuelan, Latin American, and Caribbean film.

History 

It began in 2008, started through the Cinema and Audiovisual Media Platform of Venezuela's Ministry of Culture, with the national film distributor Amazonia Films organizing the awards. It takes place during the month of October of each year on Margarita Island. Its main award is the Golden Pelican.

The festival is open to all, being reviewed positively as an area where poor children can go and watch the films being publicly screened, allowing them to see a different style of media to the blockbusters in cinemas.:89

Award Categories 
The award trophies are stylistic pelican head statuettes.

Latin American and Caribbean Films 
Awards in this category include monetary prizes in United States dollars.

 Best First Feature: Latin American and Caribbean Fiction
 Best First Feature: Latin American and Caribbean Documentary
 Best Latin American and Caribbean Animated Film
Distribution and First Copy Awards; presented by Amazonia Films to premiere the winning films in Venezuela

Venezuelan Films 
Awards in this category included monetary prizes in Venezuelan bolívares.

 Best Venezuelan Feature Film: Fiction
 Best Venezuelan Feature Film: Documentary
 Best Venezuelan Medio Film: Fiction
 Best Venezuelan Medio Film: Documentary
 Best Venezuelan Short Film: Fiction
 Best Venezuelan Short Film: Documentary

Other awards 

 Golden Pelican for Best Film

 Audience Award
 Latin America Federation of Audiovisual Education Award (Premio FEISAL)
 Venezuelan Society of Film Editors Award for Best Editing (Premio SCEV)

Recurring events 
 Rodolfo Santana "Las Primas tienen Padrinos" Screenwriting Clinic
 Project Development Course
 National Community Film and Video Contest
 "Mis Primeros Pies-cesitos" Child Film Contest
 Cinema under the Stars
 Filmarcito

Other events covering different aspects of filmmaking have been hosted by experts in the field at different editions.

References

Margarita Island
Film festivals in Venezuela
Latin America and the Caribbean